Rastrick is a village in West Yorkshire, England. 

It may also refer to:

 Rastrick High School
 John Urpeth Rastrick, an English steam locomotive builder